Huaibei is a prefecture-level city in northern Anhui Province, China. It borders Suzhou (Anhui) to the east, Bengbu to the south, Bozhou to the west, and the provinces of Henan to the northwest and Jiangsu to the northeast.

Administration

The prefecture-level city of Huaibei administers 4 county-level divisions, including 3 districts and 1 county.

Lieshan District
Xiangshan District
Duji District
Suixi County
These are further divided into 43 township-level divisions, including 20 towns, 8 townships and 15 subdistricts.

Natural environment

Geography
Situated in northern Anhui, Huaibei is located at the junction of Jiangsu, Henan, and Anhui. The town of  forms the exclave of Duji District that borders Xuzhou (Jiangsu) to the north.

Sports

The Huaibei City Stadium is located in Huaibei. The 30,000-capacity venue is used mostly for football (soccer) matches.

Climate
Huaibei city has a monsoon-influenced humid subtropical climate (Köppen: Cwa). Summers are hot and humid, and winters are cool to cold and dry.

Natural resources

Huaibei has vast quantities of mineral reserves including marble, iron, copper, gold, silver, nickel, cobalt, fire clay and limestone. It also possesses 2.726 million tons of coal.

Economy

Industry
Huaibei is the home to numerous chemical, construction, machinery, textile, power, electronics, and mineral industrial firms. The city has over 2,000 industrial enterprises, of which 22 large and medium-sized ones are run by the state.

The annual output of raw coal from Huaibei is 2,000 million tons, ranking first in eastern China.

The power industry has also developed rapidly and is currently ranked third in eastern China - Huaibei Power Station has a total installed capacity of 950 MW and an annual electricity output of 620 GW. The Huaibei No. 2 Power Station, with the total installed capacity of l.2 GW, is also being built.

The textile industry in Huaibei is ranked second in Anhui. It has established a comprehensive system of printing and dyeing, wool and silk spinning, and knitting processes. The textile firms have 200,000 spindles, 15,000 looms, with a printing & dyeing capacity of 110 million meters.

Huaibei's winemaking industry is over 1,000 years old. The Kouzi wine from the city has an annual output of 20,000 tons.

The construction industry is developing rapidly with an annual cement output of 2 million tons.

The chemical industry focuses on industrial products such as fertilizers, coke, sulphuric acid, and rubber.

The metallurgy, machinery, electronics, and food industries have also produced more than 100 kinds of products have reached or been approaching the national or international level.

Agriculture

Huaibei is the main agriculture base for producing and exporting grain, cotton, and domestic animals. The main crops are wheat, maize, cotton, broad bean, rice, and potato. Livestocks include cattle, horse, pig, goat, rabbit, and domestic birds, etc. More than 200,000 mu of land has been cultivated for fisheries that contain a large number of fish, shrimps, and crabs. The city is part of the National Agricultural Comprehensive Development Zones in Huanghai and Huaihai.

Foreign trade

Huaibei is one of the ten largest coal exporting cities in China and the largest exporter of textile products within Anhui Province. A large exporting enterprise in the city is responsible for producing 13 classes of over 100 kinds of export goods, among them coal, textile, grain, oil, silk, ores, chemicals, and pharmaceutical products. These merchandise are then exported to more than 80 countries and regions such as the United States, Japan, Australia, Canada, Western Europe, Russia, and Hong Kong, etc.

Development zone

Huaibei has formed South Lake Economic and Technological Development Zone and the Tanxikouzi Economic and Technological Development Zone to attract foreign investors.

Transportation and communication

The railways in the city are linked to Beijing-Shanghai Railway to the east, Urumqi-Lianyungang Railway to the north, and Beijing-Kowloon Railway to the west. Six state and provincial highways run through the city. Qinglongshan Port in Huaibei opens to Hongze Lake that connects to Yangtze River.

The 550 MHz stations in Huaibei can receive televised programs from more than 20 channels in China.

References

External links

Government website of Huaibei 

 
Cities in Anhui